Małgorzata Grec (born 11 September 1999) is a Polish footballer who plays as a defender for Division 1 Féminine club Dijon.

Club career
Grec's senior career started for Ekstraliga club KŚ AZS Wrocław. The next club has Grec played was Górnik Łęczna in the same league. For 2021 Grec play for SKN St. Pölten (women)

International career
Grec capped for Poland at senior level during the UEFA Women's Euro 2022 qualifying.

References

1999 births
Living people
Polish women's footballers
Women's association football defenders
Górnik Łęczna (women) players
Poland women's international footballers